Enos Thompson Throop (August 21, 1784 – November 1, 1874) was an American lawyer, politician, and diplomat who was the tenth Governor of New York from 1829 to 1832.

Early life and career
Throop was born in Johnstown, New York on August 21, 1784, the eldest child of George Bliss Throop and Abiah Thompson. He studied law in Albany with attorney George Metcalfe, where he became friendly with his fellow student Martin Van Buren. He was admitted to the bar in 1806, and began to practice law in Auburn, New York. He joined the Democratic-Republican Party, and was appointed postmaster of the village, and in 1811 county clerk of Cayuga County. In 1814, he married Evelina Vredenburgh, who died in 1834; she was the daughter of William Vredenburgh, an early landholder and investor in the area. None of their children survived infancy. The same year he was elected to the 14th United States Congress as a supporter of the war measures of the administration. He took part in the debates upon the measures to which the close of the war and the prostration of public and private credit gave rise. He also supported and voted for the act changing the compensation of congressmen from six dollars a day to $1,800 per annum, a course which temporarily clouded his political fortunes. Popular dissatisfaction with his actions was such that he was defeated at the congressional elections of April 1816, and resigned his seat on June 4, 1816. In April 1823, he was appointed Judge of the Seventh Circuit and remained on the bench until 1828 when he resigned.

Governor
In 1828, he joined his friend Martin Van Buren's ticket for the gubernatorial election as the Democratic-Republican candidate for lieutenant governor, a step that rendered it necessary for him to resign his judicial office. It was expected that Andrew Jackson would be elected president at the same election, in which event Van Buren would be made secretary of state and would, if his appointment were confirmed, have to resign the office of governor and the leadership of the party, and with Throop as his lieutenant would keep both offices in the hands of a friend. These expectations were fulfilled, and Throop succeeded to the office of governor on March 12, 1829. He was re-elected governor in 1830, defeating again Francis Granger, who had been the contender for the lieutenant-governorship at the previous election. At this time the construction of the Chenango Canal became one of the chief questions of state policy. He opposed the plan, raising such a vehement opposition to him in the localities through which the proposed canal would pass, that in 1832 he declined to seek a third term. The French observer of America Alexis de Tocqueville visited Throop on his farm near Auburn and was amazed to find that the governor engaged in farming half the year to supplement his small salary.

Later life

In 1833 he was appointed by President Jackson naval officer at the Port of New York, which office he held until February 6, 1838, when President Van Buren appointed him Chargé d'affaires of the United States to the Kingdom of the Two Sicilies. On this post he remained until January 12, 1842. After spending two years in Paris, he returned to the United States, and resided upon an estate on the banks of Owasco Lake near Auburn. Advancing years compelled him to give up farming, and in 1857 he returned to his former home, removing in 1868 to New York City, but a few years later again returning to his residence near Auburn.

He died on his estate of Willowbrook, near Auburn, on November 1, 1874, aged 90. He was buried in the churchyard of St. Peter's Episcopal Church (now Sts. Peter and St. John Church)  in Auburn.

There is a memorial to him at the Cathedral of All Saints (Albany, New York) (see image on this page) that states in Latin, integer vitae scelerisque purus, which means "upright of life and free from wickedness."

The Town of Throop, New York in Cayuga County is named after him.

Throop Avenue in Brooklyn (Kings County) and Throop Avenue in the Bronx are named after him.

References

Sources
 Political Graveyard

1784 births
1874 deaths
Democratic Party governors of New York (state)
Lieutenant Governors of New York (state)
Ambassadors of the United States to the Kingdom of the Two Sicilies
New York (state) postmasters
People from Cayuga County, New York
New York (state) state court judges
Democratic-Republican Party members of the United States House of Representatives from New York (state)
People from Johnstown, New York
19th-century American politicians
19th-century American judges
19th-century American diplomats